Warlock is an unincorporated community in Marion County, Texas, United States.

Notes

Unincorporated communities in Marion County, Texas
Unincorporated communities in Texas